Nicholas Anthony Buoniconti (December 15, 1940 – July 30, 2019) was an American professional football player who was a middle linebacker in the American Football League (AFL) and National Football League (NFL). He played for the Boston Patriots and Miami Dolphins, winning two Super Bowls with the Dolphins. Buoniconti was inducted into the Pro Football Hall of Fame in 2001.

Early life and family
Nicholas Buoniconti was born to Nicholas Anthony Buoniconti Sr. and Pasqualina "Patsy" Mercolino in Springfield, Massachusetts. The couple ran a family bakery in the predominantly Italian South End of the city. Nick was raised Roman Catholic and played football for Cathedral High School, where a plaque honoring him as a "Hometown Hall of Famer" was unveiled in 2012.

Nicholas Buoniconti graduated from Notre Dame, and was drafted by the American Football League's Patriots in the 13th round of the 1962 AFL draft.

In 1985, his son Marc suffered a spinal cord injury making a tackle for The Citadel, rendering him a quadriplegic. Nick became the public face of the group that founded the Miami Project to Cure Paralysis, now one of the world's leading neurological research centers.

Nick was married twice, and had three children by his first marriage.

College career
In 1960, as a junior, was second on the Fighting Irish in tackles (behind senior captain Myron Pottios) with  71. As a senior in 1961, Nick led the team with 74 tackles as the Irish co-captain and was rewarded with 2nd-team All-America selections from UPI, TSN, and the Football Coaches' Association. Nick was the only All-American on Notre Dame's 1961 team.

Professional career
As a tackle,  Nicholas Buoniconti was the captain of the 1961 Notre Dame football team, but NFL scouts considered him too small to play pro football. Drafted in the 13th round by the Boston Patriots in the 1962 American Football League college draft and switched to linebacker,  Nicholas Buoniconti made an immediate impact, as Nick was named the team's rookie of the year. The following year, Nick helped Boston capture the 1963 AFL Eastern Division title. With Boston, Nick appeared in five AFL All-Star Games, and recorded 24 interceptions, which is still the seventh-most in team history. Nick was named 2nd team All-AFL in 1963 and the following season began a run of five consensus All-AFL seasons in the following six seasons, missing only 1968 when Nick was named second-team All-AFL.   Nicholas  Buoniconti is a member of the Patriots All-1960s (AFL) Team and the AFL All-Time Team.

Nick was traded to the AFL's Miami Dolphins in 1969. Nick continued to play well with the Dolphins, in 1969–1974 and 1976, and made the AFL All-Star team in 1969 and the NFL  Pro Bowl in 1972 and 1973, when Nick led the Dolphins in Super Bowl wins. Nicholas Buoniconti was also named All-AFC in 1972.

His leadership made him a cornerstone of the Dolphins' defense. During his years there, the team advanced to three consecutive Super Bowl appearances under Don Shula, the second of which was the team's 1972 undefeated season. In 1973, Nick  recorded a then-team record 162 tackles (91 unassisted). Nick was named to the AFC-NFC Pro Bowl in 1972 and 1973.

Buoniconti ended his career with an unofficial 24 sacks, 18 with the Patriots and six while with the Dolphins.  His 32 career interceptions rank him third all-time among NFL linebackers.

He was named the Dolphins' Most Valuable Player three times (1969, 1970, 1973). In 1990, Nick was voted as a linebacker on the Dolphins' Silver Anniversary All-Time team. On November 18, 1991, Nick was enshrined on the Miami Dolphin's Honor Roll at Hard Rock Stadium.

Post-playing career
Buoniconti earned a J.D. degree from Suffolk University Law School during his years with the Patriots. He was a practicing attorney for a short time.  As an agent, he represented some 30 professional athletes, including baseball players Bucky Dent and Andre Dawson. He was also president of the United States Tobacco Company during the late 1970s and early 1980s. Buoniconti was a leading critic of studies which showed that smokeless tobacco caused cancer of the mouth as well as other types of cancer.

In a televised interview on the Comedy Channel toward the end of 1990, when asked his reaction to the last two undefeated teams of the season suffering losses the same Sunday, Buoniconti, indicating his cheerful countenance, told Night After Night'''s Allan Havey, "You know, I think this smile might just stay permanently on my face."

Buoniconti also appeared in one of the Miller Lite "Do you know me?" TV ads, in which he talked about the No-Name Defense. The punch line was a variation on an old joke, with Buoniconti remarking that everyone knows him now. A passerby remarks, "Hey, I know you... you're... uh... uh..." trying to recall Buoniconti's name. Upon being told that it's Nick Buoniconti, the passerby says, "No, that's not it."

Buoniconti was a co-host of the HBO series Inside the NFL'' until 2001.  That same year, he was inducted into the Pro Football Hall of Fame.

Buoniconti is a member of the National Italian American Sports Hall of Fame.

Buoniconti openly shared that he struggled with neurological issues, with one or several different diagnoses potentially being the cause. On November 3, 2017, he announced that he would posthumously donate his brain to aid CTE research. In March 2018, he joined with former NFL stars Harry Carson and Phil Villapiano to support a parent initiative called Flag Football Under 14, which advises no tackle football under that age.

Death
Buoniconti died of pneumonia on July 30, 2019, in Bridgehampton, New York, at the age of 78.

See also
List of American Football League players

References

External links
 New England Patriots bio

1940 births
2019 deaths
American Football League players
American football middle linebackers
American people of Italian descent
Boston Patriots players
Miami Dolphins players
National Football League announcers
Notre Dame Fighting Irish football players
American Conference Pro Bowl players
American Football League All-Star players
American Football League All-Time Team
Pro Football Hall of Fame inductees
Suffolk University Law School alumni
Sportspeople from Springfield, Massachusetts
Players of American football from Massachusetts
Deaths from pneumonia in New York (state)